Gasparri  is a surname of Italian origin. Notable people with the name include:

 Andrea Gasparri, Italian footballer
 Enrico Gasparri (1871-1946), Italian cardinal
 Franco Gasparri (1948-1999), Italian actor
 Maurizio Gasparri (1956-), Italian politician
 Pietro Gasparri (1852-1934), Italian cardinal 

Italian-language surnames